St Peter's Church is an Anglican parish church in Redcar, Redcar and Cleveland, North Yorkshire, England. It was designed in 1829 by Ignatius Bonomi from Durham and is dedicated to St. Peter. It is near the seafront and coastline of the North Sea and Yorkshire Coast. It is an active place of worship in the Diocese of York.

References

External links

Churches completed in 1829
Redcar, St Peter
Redcar, St Peter
Buildings and structures in Redcar and Cleveland
Redcar